Rodrigo Parra Vázquez (born 30 August 2003) is a Mexican professional footballer who plays as a right-back for Liga MX club Tijuana.

International career
Parra was called up by Raúl Chabrand to participate with the under-21 team at the 2022 Maurice Revello Tournament, where Mexico finished the tournament in third place.

Career statistics

Club

References

External links
 
 
 

Living people
2003 births
Mexico youth international footballers
Association football defenders
Club Tijuana footballers
Liga MX players
Footballers from San Luis Potosí
People from Matehuala
Mexican footballers